The International Freeskiers & Snowboarders Association (IFSA) was established in 1996 – as the "International Freeskiers Association" – by renowned freeskiers Shane McConkey, Lhotse Hawk, and a number of industry athletes and organizers.  

Today the 501(c)(3) nonprofit organization is located in Salt Lake City, Utah, U.S., and run by freeskier Dave "Swany" Swanwick.  The IFSA organizes big mountain "extreme" skiing competitions for kids around the US and Canada.

References

External links
 International Freeskiers & Snowboarders Association official website

International sports organizations
Skiing organizations
501(c)(3) organizations
Non-profit organizations based in Utah
Sports organizations established in 1996